Sven Ove Hansson (born 1951) is a Swedish philosopher. He is a professor of philosophy and chair of the Department of Philosophy and History of Technology at the Royal Institute of Technology (KTH) in Stockholm, Sweden. He is an author and scientific skeptic, with a special interest in environmental risk assessment, as well as in decision theory and belief revision.

Career
Hansson obtained a bachelor's degree in medical science in 1972, and then worked for a Swedish trade union, followed by a job with the Swedish Social Democrats.
He received a PhD in theoretical philosophy at Uppsala University in 1991, following which he was from 1993 to 1999 forskarassistent (the Swedish equivalent of an associate professor) at Uppsala. He received a second PhD in practical philosophy at the University of Lund in 1999, and since 2000 he has been a professor at KTH; he became department head in 2005.

The Swedish Government appointed Hansson to the Products Control Board (1976–1982; the predecessor of the National Chemicals Inspectorate), the National Board for Spent Nuclear Fuel (1981–1992) and the Natural Science Foundation (1989–1992). He continues to write on radiation exposure risk assessment. He was also a member of two temporary Commissions on environmental policies appointed by the Swedish Government, expert advisor to a 1999–2000 Swedish government committee the kemikaliekommittén, and a member of the board of the MISTRA project New Strategy for the risk management of chemical substances. Hansson's contributions on theories of risk assessment have been cited as recently as 2012.

Since December 2000, Hansson has been a member of forskningsberedningen, the Swedish government's advisory board of researchers.

Hansson has contributed to the development of belief revision theory, in particular, analysis of application of the AGM postulates. His work is also cited in discussions of ethics in institutional decision-making. Google Scholar lists 17,417 citations of his work and gives his h-index as 68 and i10-index as 271	.  he continues to publish on ethics, logic and public health in major journals.

Since September 1999 he has been the Editor-in-Chief of Theoria, the only international, peer-reviewed, philosophy journal published in Sweden. He was the founding chairperson of the Swedish Skeptics (Vetenskap och Folkbildning), and is still a board member and editor of the organisation's journal Folkvett.

Hansson has criticized anthroposophy as a pseudo-science.

Publications
He has published numerous articles and books in Swedish and in English.

Books in English

Selected journal articles in English

References

External links
 
 List of Hansson's publications in English
 
 

1951 births
Living people
Swedish skeptics
Swedish philosophers
Academic staff of the KTH Royal Institute of Technology
Uppsala University alumni